Blistering distal dactylitis is a cutaneous condition characterized by tense superficial bullae occurring on a tender erythematous base over the volar fat pad of the phalanx of a finger or thumb. The most common organism responsible for this is Beta-hemolytic Streptococci.

See also 
 List of cutaneous conditions

References 

Bacterium-related cutaneous conditions